Tullio Lanese (born 10 January 1947, in Messina) is a former Italian football referee and a former President of the Italian Referees Association, the AIA.

Referee

From 1987  to 1992  he held the qualification of international referee, officiating in a total of 38 matches, including some matches of the final phase of the 1990 World Cup in Italy: Brazil-Sweden 2-1 in Turin, Uruguay-South Korea 1-0 in Udine  and the last 16 encounter Cameroon-Colombia (2-1 after extra time) in Naples.   He also refereed the European Cup final in 1991 and the semi-final between Sweden and Germany at the 1992 European Championships.

The Calciopoli scandal 

As a result of the 2006 Italian football scandal , he resigned as President of the AIA; at the end of the legal process he was sentenced by the Federal Court to prohibition for 2 years and 6 months, the sentence was reduced by the Chamber of Conciliation and Arbitration of CONI to 1 year, being replaced by Luigi Agnolin , as Extraordinary Commissioner.

The Naples prosecutor asked for the indictment of Lanese under the charge of criminal association aimed at sports fraud, and the trial was concluded at first instance with a sentence of 2 years of imprisonment.

On December 5, 2012, the fourth section of the Court of Appeal of Naples overturned the sentence of first instance acquitting him.

On 17 October 2012 the Court of Auditors sentenced Lanese, together with the referees involved in the scandal, to compensate the Italian Football Federation on charges of damage to their image. The former referee would have to pay € 500,000. 

On March 24, 2015 the prosecution's appeal against the plaintiff's acquittal was declared inadmissible in the Supreme Court.

Politics

In 2008 he was nominated by the UDC for the regional elections in Sicily , but was not elected.

References

External links
  Profile

1947 births
Sportspeople from Messina
Italian police officers
Italian football referees
FIFA World Cup referees
1990 FIFA World Cup referees
Living people
UEFA Euro 1992 referees
Olympic football referees